The United Kingdom is a country located off the north-western coast of continental Europe. 

United Kingdom may also refer to:

Arts and entertainment
 A United Kingdom, a 2016 biographical film
 United Kingdom (album), a 1989 album by American Music Club
 United Kingdoms (album), a 1993 album by Ultramarine

Political entities 
 Federal monarchy, a type of federation
 United Kingdom of Great Britain and Ireland, the United Kingdom between 1801 and 1922
 United Kingdom of the Netherlands, an unofficial name for the Kingdom of the Netherlands from 1815 until 1839
 United Kingdom of Libya, a state between 1951 and 1969
 United Kingdom of Portugal, Brazil and the Algarves, the Portuguese state between 1815 and 1825
 United Kingdom of Denmark, one of several official translations of the Danish word Rigsfællesskabet
 United Kingdom of Denmark and Norway, a state between 1523 and 1814
 United Kingdoms of Sweden and Norway, a political union between 1814 and 1905
 United Monarchy of Israel and Judah, a  state between 1050 BC and 930 BC
 United Kingdom of Poland, a state between 1320 and 1386

See also
 Terminology of the British Isles
 
 United Kingdoms (disambiguation)